Falniowskia is a genus of minute freshwater snails with an operculum, aquatic gastropod molluscs or micromolluscs in the family Hydrobiidae.

Species
Species within the genus Falniowskia include:

Falniowskia neglectissima (Falniowski & Steffek, 1989)

References

Hydrobiidae
Taxonomy articles created by Polbot